Tudeh Youth Organization is the youth wing of the Tudeh Party of Iran that was founded in 1943. The organization is affiliated with World Federation of Democratic Youth (WFDY).

It published Mardom Baraye Javanan weekly and then Razm daily newspapers. 

The organization was led by Reza Radmanesh, who was succeeded by Nader Sharmini from 1947 to 1952. Under the leadership of the latter, the organization proposed more radical slogans while siding with the moderate faction of the party and attacking the hardliner faction for being not enough revolutionary.

In 1966, a split occurred in the organization when a group of members left the party because they considered themselves Maoist. They subsequently founded an organization named the Revolutionary Organization of the Tudeh Party.

References 

Affiliated organizations of the Tudeh Party of Iran
1943 establishments in Iran
Organizations established in 1943
Youth wings of communist parties
Youth wings of political parties in Iran
World Federation of Democratic Youth